The Prince & Me: The Elephant Adventure (also known as The Prince & Me 4 and renamed The Prince & Me 4: Royal Adventures in Paradise when shown on television) is a 2010 American romantic comedy film directed by Catherine Cyran, which was released direct-to-video. It is a sequel to The Prince & Me 3: A Royal Honeymoon.

Plot
One year after their royal wedding, King Edvard and Queen Paige Morgan of Denmark received an invitation to attend the wedding of Princess Myra of Sangyoon. Upon their arrival, Paige finds Myra is unhappy with her arranged marriage to the brooding and sinister Kah and is secretly in love with a young elephant handler named Alu. When the secret romance between Myra and Alu is revealed, Alu is thrown into jail, and the sacred wedding elephant goes missing in the jungle. To save Princess Myra, Paige and Eddie must find the elephant and free Alu before convincing the king of Sangyoon that true love reigns supreme over all.

Cast
Kam Heskin as Paige Morgan, Queen of Denmark.
Chris Geere as Edvard, King of Denmark.
Jonathan Firth as Søren.
Selina Lo as Rayen.
Ase Wang as Princess Myra.
David Bueno as Soldier No. 3.
Prinya Intachai as Kah.
Frank DeMartini as Drummer.
Joe Cummings as Violist.
Vithaya Pansringarm as King Saryu.
Leigh Barwell as Nurse.
David Allen Jones as Guitar Player.
Amarin Cholvibul as Alu.
Felix John Fraser as Secret Agent 2.
John Dang as Singer.
Charlie Ruedpokanon as Soldier #2.
Peter Mossman as Secret Service Agent #1.
Emma Dortsch as Little Girl.

References

External links

 

2010 films
2010 direct-to-video films
2010 romantic comedy films
American direct-to-video films
American romantic comedy films
American sequel films
Direct-to-video sequel films
Films about elephants
Films about royalty
Films about vacationing
Films about weddings
Films set in Asia
Films shot in Thailand
Nu Image films
The Prince & Me films
2010s English-language films
Films directed by Catherine Cyran
Films with screenplays by Boaz Davidson
2010s American films